927 Ratisbona is a large and dark background asteroid, approximately  in diameter, located in the outer region of the asteroid belt. It was discovered on 16 February 1920, by astronomer Max Wolf at the Heidelberg Observatory in southwest Germany. The carbonaceous C-type asteroid (CB) has a rotation period of 12.99 hours and is rather spherical in shape. It was named after the Bavarian city of Regensburg.

Orbit and classification 

Ratisbona is a non-family asteroid of the main belt's background population when applying the hierarchical clustering method to its proper orbital elements. It orbits the Sun in the outer asteroid belt at a distance of 2.9–3.5 AU once every 5 years and 10 months (2,119 days; semi-major axis of 3.23 AU). Its orbit has an eccentricity of 0.09 and an inclination of 15° with respect to the ecliptic. The body's observation arc begins at Heidelberg-Königstuhl State Observatory on 17 February 1920, the night after its official discovery observation.

Naming 

This minor planet was named after the Latin name of the German city of Regensburg in Bavaria, where astronomer Johannes Kepler died in 1630. The  was mentioned in the astronomical journal Astronomische Nachrichten in 1930.

Physical characteristics 

In the Tholen classification, Ratisbona is most similar to a common, carbonaceous C-type asteroid, and somewhat similar to a brighter B-type asteroid, based on a nosy spectrum (CB:).

Rotation period 

Over the course of seven nights in January 2018, a rotational lightcurve of Ratisbona was obtained from photometric observations by Tom Polakis at the Command Module Observatory  in Arizona. Lightcurve analysis gave a rotation period of  hours with a low brightness variation of  magnitude, indicative of a regular, spherical shape. The result supersedes a period of  hours with an amplitude of  magnitude determined by René Roy, Raoul Behrend, Pierre Antonini and Donn Starkey in October 2004.

Diameter and albedo 

The Collaborative Asteroid Lightcurve Link adopts the results from IRAS, that is, a albedo of 0.0591 and a diameter of 67.57 km based on an absolute magnitude of 9.54. An asteroid occultation, observed on 13 September 2014, gave a best-fit ellipse dimension of 78.0 × 78.0 kilometers. These timed observations are taken when the asteroid passes in front of a distant star. However the quality of the measurement is rated poorly.

References

External links 
 Lightcurve Database Query (LCDB), at www.minorplanet.info
 Dictionary of Minor Planet Names, Google books
 Asteroids and comets rotation curves, CdR – Geneva Observatory, Raoul Behrend
 Discovery Circumstances: Numbered Minor Planets (1)-(5000) – Minor Planet Center
 
 

000927
Discoveries by Max Wolf
Named minor planets
000927
19200216